MoMiG is the acronym for the “Modernisierung des GmbH-Rechts und zur Bekämpfung von Missbräuchen” or “Law for the Modernisation of the German Limited Liability Company Law and the Prevention of Misuse”. MoMiG came into effect in Germany on 1 November 2008.

The general purpose of MoMiG is to accelerate establishment of business, modernise the German limited liability (GmbH) law to make the GmbH structure more competitive internationally, and minimise abuse of company law.

Main innovations of MoMiG

References
1 ‘A new face for the German limited liability company (GmbH)’, Schultze & Braun (post-enactment)
2 Federal Ministry of Justice, 23 May 2007 Press Release (pre-enactment)
3 'Fundamental Reform of German Company Law Approved by German Bundestag', Debevoise & Plimpton (pre-enactment)

Further Reading

Ulrich Seibert, Gesetz zur Modernisierung des GmbH-Rechts und zur Bekämpfung von Missbräuchen - MoMiG RWS-Verlag, Köln 2008. 

German business laws